Security is a 2017 American action thriller film directed by Alain DesRochers and written by Tony Mosher and John Sullivan. The film stars Antonio Banderas, Gabriella Wright, Ben Kingsley, and Chad Lindberg.

Plot 
Eddie Deacon is a former Marine Corps Security Captain who has been unable to find a decent job since retiring from the corps and consequently has grown distant from his wife and daughter. Searching for jobs to support his family, he finally gets a job as a mall security guard through a welfare officer. He starts that same night and gets a hands-on orientation by Vance, the head of a small group of on-duty mall cops, including Ruby, Mason and Johnny.

Meanwhile, a US Marshal convoy transporting a little girl named Jamie is ambushed by professional, heavily armed mercenaries. She is the main witness in an organized crime trial. Though all the marshals are killed in the ensuing battle, Jamie manages to escape and finds refuge at the mall, where she is taken in by Eddie and Vance. The mercenaries leader Charlie arrives at the mall and poses as Jamie's father to gain access to her. The ruse subsequently fails when she frantically tries to get away from him. Charlie then offers them $1.25m to turn Jamie over to them. Eddie refuses and Charlie prepares to storm the mall, setting a perimeter and disabling their cars. Mason informs Eddie and the other guards that Jamie's father was the money man for a cartel who chose to inform on them and was subsequently killed. Jamie witnessed the murder and was placed in witness protection so she is able to testify against them. Eddie places her in a storage room to keep her safe and stays in touch with her by radio, promising to protect her.

Eddie and the guards make homemade bombs and various other traps to defend the mall. They are somewhat successful and manage to kill quite a few of the mercenaries, but Johnny is killed by a sniper whilst trying to signal the police and Ruby is mortally wounded whilst aiding Vance's escape. Eddie bonds with Jamie and gives her a taser for protection.  Meanwhile, several US Marshals arrive, and Eddie signals Mason to bring Jamie down to them, but in the process notices a telltale tattoo on their necks, leading him to realise they are part of the gang luring them out, and is able to kill them all, but not before they kill Mason. Vance eliminates the remaining mercenaries aiding Jamie's exit, but is badly wounded and is presumed dead.

Eddie tells Jamie to go and fetch a radio in order to signal for help, and then goes to take out the gang's van outside that is jamming the outside radio signal, but is attacked by Charlie's second in command Dead Eyes. He is able to subdue him long enough to escape on a motorised trike that was in the mall and then uses that to crash into the radio van, taking it out. Dead Eyes attacks again, but Eddie is able to kill him and the sniper using a gun that Vance kept in his car, being shot himself in the process.

Meanwhile Charlie stalks Jamie in the mall and tells her how he too was abandoned by his father, and offers to look after her in return for her silence. She escapes briefly, but Charlie finds her hiding. Eddie staggers in wounded and Charlie tells him he should have just taken the money and raises his gun. Jamie however is able to shock him with the taser Eddie gave her, enabling him to shoot Charlie in the head with Vance's pistol, killing him.

The police arrive and take Jamie to safety. She embraces Eddie, who sees Vance being taken into an ambulance, having survived his injuries. She visits Eddie in the hospital and tells him his daughter is lucky to have a father like him. Her uncle then arrives to take her home. In the last scene, Eddie is shown reuniting with his wife and daughter.

Cast 

 Antonio Banderas as Eddie Deacon
 Ben Kingsley as Charlie
 Liam McIntyre as Vance
 Cung Le as Dead Eyes
 Katherine Mary de la Rocha as Jamie
 Chad Lindberg as Mason
 Jiro Wang as Johnny Wei
 Gabriella Wright as Ruby

 Shari Watson as Administrator

Production 
Principal photography on the film began in November 2015 in Bulgaria and ended on January 22, 2016. Alain DesRochers directed the $15 million budgeted film for Nu Image / Millennium Films.

Broadcast
On October 3, 2017, the film became available to stream on Netflix in various countries.

Critical response 
On review aggregator Rotten Tomatoes, the film holds an approval rating of 34% based on 319 reviews.

References

External links 
 
 

American action thriller films
2017 action thriller films
Films about security and surveillance
Films shot in Bulgaria
Nu Image films
Films directed by Alain DesRochers
2010s English-language films
2010s American films